The 2020 season was the Chicago White Sox' 121st season in Chicago and 120th in the American League. The Sox played their home games at Guaranteed Rate Field.

On March 12, 2020, MLB announced that because of the ongoing COVID-19 pandemic, the start of the regular season would be delayed by at least two weeks in addition to the remainder of spring training being cancelled. Four days later, it was announced that the start of the season would be pushed back indefinitely due to the recommendation made by the CDC to restrict events of more than 50 people for eight weeks. On June 23, commissioner Rob Manfred unilaterally implemented a 60-game season. Players reported to training camps on July 1 in order to resume spring training and prepare for a July 24 Opening Day.

Due to the pandemic and the shortened season, Major League Baseball instituted certain rule changes which included the use of a universal designated hitter, a runner on second base to start extra innings, and a revised schedule. On July 30, the league and the union agreed that all remaining doubleheaders on the season would be seven innings.

On April 1, 2020, longtime White Sox radio broadcaster Ed Farmer died at the age of 70.

On September 17, with a win against the Minnesota Twins, the White Sox clinched their first playoff spot since 2008. This was their first winning season since 2012. They lost in three games to the Oakland Athletics in the 2020 American League Wild Card Series.

Offseason

Rule changes
For the 2020 season, MLB instituted several new rule changes including the following:
 Single trade deadline – there will no longer be a waiver trade deadline later in the year.
 26-man roster – rosters will expand from 25 players, but no team may carry more than 13 pitchers.
 Three-batter minimum for pitchers - a pitcher must face three batters in a game before they can be removed unless there is an injury or the end of an inning.

Further rule changes came into effect in response to the COVID-19 pandemic including the use of the DH in the National League, a shortened schedule, and starting extra innings with a runner at second base.

Transactions
 November 21, 2019: Catcher Yasmani Grandal signed as a free agent by the White Sox to a four-year, $73 million contract.
 November 22, 2019: 1st Baseman José Abreu signed a three-year contract extension worth $50 million with the White Sox.
 December 2, 2019: Catcher James McCann signed a one-year extension with the White Sox.
 December 10, 2019: White Sox trade outfielder Steele Walker to the Texas Rangers for outfielder Nomar Mazara.
 December 20, 2019: LHP Gio González signed as a free agent by the White Sox to a one-year, $5 million contract.
 December 30, 2019: LHP Dallas Keuchel signed as a free agent by the White Sox to a three-year, $55.5 million contract.
 January 2, 2020: Outfielder Luis Robert signed a six-year contract extension worth $50 million with the White Sox.
 January 9, 2020: 1B-DH Edwin Encarnación signed as a free agent by the White Sox to a one-year, $12 million contract.
 January 14, 2020: RHP Steve Cishek signed as a free agent by the White Sox to a one-year, $6 million contract.

Regular season
On August 13, the White Sox were supposed to play the first ever MLB at Field of Dreams game against the New York Yankees at a temporary 8,000 seat ballpark in Dyersville, Iowa before the pandemic came. MLB then announced the shortened season and that the AL and NL will play against each other in the same division which took the Yankees off the matchup. Then on July 1, MLB announced that the St. Louis Cardinals would replace the Yankees for the game. Then in late July, a majority of Cardinals players and coaches tested positive for COVID-19. The MLB announced on August 3 that the Field of Dreams game would be rescheduled to August 12, 2021 in which the White Sox would still participate and their opponent will once again be the Yankees.

Game log

|- style="background:#fbb;"
| 1 || July 24 ||Twins|| 7:10pm || 5–10 ||May (1–0) ||Giolito (0–1) ||—|| 0–1 ||L1
|- style="background:#cfc;"
| 2 || July 25 ||Twins|| 1:10pm || 10–3 ||Keuchel (1–0) ||Dobnak (0–1) ||—|| 1–1 ||W1
|- style="background:#fbb;"
| 3 || July 26 ||Twins|| 1:10pm || 2–14 ||Maeda (1–0) ||López (0–1) ||—|| 1–2 ||L1
|- style="background:#bbb;"
|—|| July 27 || @ Indians|| colspan="8" |Postponed (inclement weather)
|- style="background:#fbb;"
| 4 || July 28 || @ Indians|| 3:40pm || 3–4 ||Civale (1–0) ||Cease (0–1) ||Hand (2) || 1–3 ||L2
|- style="background:#fbb;"
| 5 || July 28 || @ Indians|| TBA || 3–5 ||Plutko (1–0) ||Rodón (0–1) ||Hill (1) || 1–4 ||L3
|- style="background:#cfc;"
| 6 || July 29 || @ Indians|| 5:10pm || 4–0 ||Bummer (1–0) ||Hand (0–1) ||—|| 2–4 ||W1
|- style="background:#cfc;"
| 7 || July 31 || @ Royals|| 7:05pm || 3–2 ||Keuchel (2–0) ||Bubic (0–1) ||Colomé (1) || 3–4 ||W2
|-

|- style="background:#cfc;"
| 8 || August 1 || @ Royals|| 6:05pm || 11–5 ||Foster (1–0) ||Bolaños (0–2) ||Heuer (1) || 4–4 ||W3
|- style="background:#cfc;"
| 9 || August 2 || @ Royals|| 1:05pm || 9–2 ||Cease (1–1) ||Barlow (1–1) ||—|| 5–4 ||W4
|- style="background:#cfc;"
| 10 || August 3 || @ Brewers|| 7:10pm || 6–4 ||Detwiler (1–0) ||Phelps (1–1) ||Colomé (2) || 6–4 ||W5
|- style="background:#cfc;"
| 11 || August 4 || @ Brewers|| 7:10pm || 3–2 ||Giolito (1–1) ||Williams (0–1) ||Colomé (3) || 7–4 ||W6
|- style="background:#fbb;"
| 12 || August 5 ||Brewers|| 7:10pm || 0–1 ||Houser (1–0) ||Keuchel (2–1) ||Hader (2) || 7–5 ||L1
|- style="background:#fbb;"
| 13 || August 6 ||Brewers|| 7:10pm || 3–8 ||Lindblom (1–0) ||González (0–1) ||—|| 7–6 ||L2
|- style="background:#cfc;"
| 14 || August 7 ||Indians|| 7:10pm || 2–0 ||Cease (2–1) ||Civale (1–2) ||Colomé (4) || 8–6 ||W1
|- style="background:#fbb;"
| 15 || August 8 ||Indians|| 1:10pm || 1–7 ||Plesac (1–1) ||Anderson (0–1) ||—|| 8–7 ||L1
|- style="background:#fbb;"
| 16 || August 9 ||Indians|| 1:10pm || 4–5 ||Maton (1–0) ||Cordero (0–1) ||Pérez (1) || 8–8 ||L2
|- style="background:#fbb;"
| 17 || August 10 || @ Tigers|| 6:10pm || 1–5 ||Norris (1–1) ||Keuchel (2–2) ||—|| 8–9 ||L3
|- style="background:#cfc;"
| 18 || August 11 || @ Tigers|| 6:10pm || 8–4 ||Foster (2–0) ||Alexander (1–1) ||—|| 9–9 ||W1
|- style="background:#cfc;"
| 19 || August 12 || @ Tigers|| 12:10pm || 7–5 ||Cease (3–1) ||Boyd (0–2) ||Colomé (5) || 10–9 ||W2
|- style="background:#fbb;"
| 20 || August 15 ||Cardinals|| 1:10pm || 1–5 ||Wainwright (2–0) ||Giolito (1–2) ||—|| 10–10 ||L1
|- style="background:#fbb;"
| 21 || August 15 ||Cardinals|| 3:15pm || 3–6 ||Cabrera (1–0) ||Marshall (0–1) ||Miller (1) || 10–11 ||L2
|- style="background:#cfc;"
| 22 || August 16 ||Cardinals|| 1:10pm || 7–2 ||Keuchel (3–2) ||Hudson (0–2) ||—|| 11–11 ||W1
|- style="background:#cfc;"
| 23 || August 17 ||Tigers|| 7:10pm || 7–2 ||Heuer (1–0) ||Boyd (0–3) ||—|| 12–11 ||W2
|- style="background:#cfc;"
| 24 || August 18 ||Tigers|| 7:10pm || 10–4 ||Cease (4–1) ||Skubal (0–1) ||—|| 13–11 ||W3
|- style="background:#cfc;"
| 25 || August 19 ||Tigers|| 7:10pm || 5–3 ||Marshall (1–1) ||Soto (0–1) ||Colomé (6) || 14–11 ||W4
|- style="background:#cfc;"
| 26 || August 20 ||Tigers|| 1:10pm || 9–0 ||Giolito (2–2) ||Turnbull (2–2) ||—|| 15–11 ||W5
|- style="background:#cfc;"
| 27 || August 21 || @ Cubs|| 7:15pm || 10–1 ||Keuchel (4–2) ||Lester (2–1) ||—|| 16–11 ||W6
|- style="background:#cfc;"
| 28 || August 22 || @ Cubs|| 7:15pm || 7–4 ||González (1–1) ||Hendricks (3–3) ||—|| 17–11 ||W7
|- style="background:#fbb;"
| 29 || August 23 || @ Cubs|| 1:20pm || 1–2 ||Darvish (5–1) ||Cease (4–2) ||Jeffress (3) || 17–12 ||L1
|- style="background:#cfc;"
| 30 || August 25 ||Pirates|| 7:10pm || 4–0 ||Giolito (3–2) ||Brault (0–1) ||—|| 18–12 ||W1
|- style="background:#cfc;"
| 31 || August 26 ||Pirates|| 1:10pm || 10–3 ||Keuchel (2–0) ||Williams (1–5) ||—|| 19–12 ||W2
|- style="background:#cfc;"
| 32 || August 28 ||Royals|| 7:10pm || 6–5 ||Colomé (1–0) ||Kennedy (0–2) ||—|| 20–12 ||W3
|- style="background:#fbb;"
| 33 || August 29 ||Royals|| 1:10pm || 6–9 ||Newberry (1–0) ||Burdi (0–1) ||Hahn (1) || 20–13 ||L1
|- style="background:#cfc;"
| 34 || August 30 ||Royals|| 1:10pm || 5–2 ||Foster (3–0) ||Zuber (1–2) ||—|| 21–13 ||W1
|- style="background:#cfc;"
| 35 || August 31 || @ Twins|| 7:10pm || 8–5 || Foster (4–0) || Rogers (1–3) || Colomé (7) || 22–13 || W2
|-

|- style="background:#fbb;"
| 36 || September 1 || @ Twins|| 7:10pm || 2–3 || Thielbar (1–0) || Cordero (0–2) || Wisler (1) || 22–14 || L1
|- style="background:#fbb;"
| 37 || September 2 || @ Twins|| 7:10pm || 1–8 || Berríos (3–3) || López (0–2) ||—|| 22–15 || L2
|- style="background:#cfc;"
| 38 || September 3 || @ Royals|| 7:05pm || 11–6 || Cease (5–2) || Duffy (2–3) ||—|| 23–15 || W1
|- style="background:#cfc;"
| 39 || September 4 || @ Royals|| 7:05pm || 7–4 || Heuer (2–0) || Singer (1–4) || Colomé (8) || 24–15 || W2
|- style="background:#cfc;"
| 40 || September 5 || @ Royals|| 6:05pm || 5–3 || Giolito (4–2) || Bubic (0–5) || Colomé (9) || 25–15 || W3
|- style="background:#cfc;"
| 41 || September 6 || @ Royals|| 1:05pm || 8–2 || Keuchel (6–2) || Harvey (0–3) ||—|| 26–15 || W4
|- style="background:#fbb;"
| 42 || September 8 || @ Pirates|| 6:05pm || 4–5 || Rodríguez (2–2) || Detwiler (1–1) ||—|| 26–16 || L1
|- style="background:#cfc;"
| 43 || September 9 || @ Pirates|| 6:05pm || 8–1 || Dunning (1–0) || Brubaker (1–1) ||—|| 27–16 || W1
|- style="background:#cfc;"
| 44 || September 11 ||Tigers|| 7:10pm || 4–3 || Marshall (2–1) || Cisnero (2–3) || Colomé (10) || 28–16 || W2
|- style="background:#cfc;"
| 45 || September 12 ||Tigers|| 6:10pm || 14–0 || López (1–2) || Fulmer (0–2) ||—|| 29–16 || W3
|- style="background:#cfc;"
| 46 || September 13 ||Tigers|| 1:10pm || 5–2 || Cordero (1–2) || Turnbull (4–3) || Colomé (11) || 30–16 || W4
|- style="background:#cfc;"
| 47 || September 14 ||Twins|| 7:10pm || 3–1 || Colomé (2–0) || Rogers (1–4) ||—|| 31–16 || W5
|- style="background:#cfc;"
| 48 || September 15 ||Twins|| 7:10pm || 6–2 || Dunning (2–0) || Dobnak (6–4) ||—|| 32–16 || W6
|- style="background:#fbb;"
| 49 || September 16 ||Twins|| 7:10pm || 1–5 || Stashak (1–0) || Giolito (4–3) ||—|| 32–17 || L1
|- style="background:#cfc;"
| 50 || September 17 ||Twins|| 1:10pm || 4–3 || Heuer (3–0) || Clippard (1–1) || Colomé (12) || 33–17 || W1
|- style="background:#fbb;"
| 51 || September 18 || @ Reds|| 6:10pm || 1–7 || Mahle (2–2) || Stiever (0–1) ||—|| 33–18 || L1
|- style="background:#cfc;"
| 52 || September 19 || @ Reds|| 5:10pm || 5–0 || Foster (5–0) || Bauer (4–4) ||—|| 34–18 || W1
|- style="background:#fbb;"
| 53 || September 20 || @ Reds|| 12:10pm || 3–7 || Sims (3–0) || Cease (5–3) ||—|| 34–19 || L1
|- style="background:#fbb;"
| 54 || September 21 || @ Indians|| 5:10pm || 4–7 || Civale (4–5) || Fry (0–1) || Hand (14) || 34–20 || L2
|- style="background:#fbb;"
| 55 || September 22 || @ Indians|| 5:10pm || 3–5  || Maton (3–3) || Foster (5–1) ||—|| 34–21 || L3
|- style="background:#fbb;"
| 56 || September 23 || @ Indians|| 5:10pm || 2–3 || Hand (2–1) || González (1–2) ||—|| 34–22 || L4
|- style="background:#fbb;"
| 57 || September 24 || @ Indians|| 5:10pm || 4–5 || Hill (2–0) || Rodón (0–2) || Hand (15) || 34–23 || L5
|- style="background:#fbb;"
| 58 || September 25 ||Cubs|| 7:10pm || 0–10 || Darvish (8–3) || Cease (5–4) ||—|| 34–24 || L6
|- style="background:#cfc;"
| 59 || September 26 ||Cubs|| 6:10pm || 9–5 || Foster (6–1) || Lester (3–3) ||—|| 35–24 || W1
|- style="background:#fbb;"
| 60 || September 27 ||Cubs|| 2:10pm || 8–10 || Alzolay (1–1) || López (1–3) || Chafin (1) || 35–25 || L1
|-

|- style="text-align:center;"
| Legend:       = Win       = Loss       = PostponementBold = White Sox team member

Season standings

American League Central

American League Wild Card

Record against opponents

Detailed records

Achievements
 In the fifth inning of their August 16 game against the St. Louis Cardinals, the White Sox hit four consecutive home runs (Yoan Moncada, Yasmani Grandal, Jose Abreu, and Eloy Jimenez), becoming the tenth team in major league history to do so and only the 2nd time it has happened in Franchise history.
 On August 22 and 23, José Abreu tied an MLB record by hitting a Home Run in 4 straight at-bats against the Chicago Cubs. Abreu hit three Home Runs in his 3 at-bats on August 22 off of pitchers Kyle Hendricks, Rowan Wick, and Duane Underwood Jr. then hit a Home Run on his first at-bat off of Yu Darvish the following day. 
 On August 25 against the Pittsburgh Pirates, pitcher Lucas Giolito recorded his first career no-hitter in a 4–0 win. It was the first no-hitter of the MLB season. Giolito struck out 13 batters and threw 74 of 101 pitches for strikes. His only blemish was a lead off walk to Erik González in the fourth inning. It was the first no-hitter for a Sox pitcher since Philip Humber pitched a perfect game in 2012 and the 19th in White Sox History.
 In August, the Sox set a new franchise record for most home runs in a month (52).
 The Sox became the first team in Major League history to go undefeated against left-handed pitching with a record of 14–0.
 The White Sox led the American League in home runs (96), slugging percentage (.453) and total bases (928).

Postseason

Game log 

|-style="background:#cfc;"
| 1 || September 29 || @ Athletics || 4–1 || Giolito (1–0) || Luzardo (0–1) || Colomé (1) || 2:00pm || 1–0 || W1
|-style="background:#fbb;"
| 2 || September 30 || @ Athletics || 3–5 || Bassitt (1–0) || Keuchel (0–1) || Diekman (1) || 2:00pm || 1–1 || L1
|-style="background:#fbb;"
| 3 || October 1 || @ Athletics || 4–6 || Montas (1–0) || Marshall (0–1) || Hendriks (1) || 2:00pm || 1–2 || L1
|-

Postseason rosters

| style="text-align:left" |
Pitchers: 27 Lucas Giolito 39 Aaron Bummer 43 Evan Marshall 45 Garrett Crochet 48 Álex Colomé 50 Jimmy Cordero 51 Dane Dunning 55 Carlos Rodón 57 Jace Fry 60 Dallas Keuchel 63 Matt Foster 65 Codi Heuer 84 Dylan Cease 
Catchers: 24 Yasmani Grandal 33 James McCann 38 Zack Collins 
Infielders: 1 Nick Madrigal 5 Yolmer Sánchez 7 Tim Anderson 10 Yoán Moncada 79 José Abreu 
Outfielders: 15 Adam Engel 28 Leury García 30 Nomar Mazara 32 Jarrod Dyson 74 Eloy Jiménez 88 Luis Robert
Designated hitters: 23 Edwin Encarnación 
|- valign="top"

Roster

Awards and honors
José Abreu won the American League Player of the Month for July/August. 

Luis Robert won the American League Rookie of the Month for July/August. Robert also won the American League Gold Glove for Center field becoming the second rookie in White Sox history to do so. 

The White Sox had 3 players winning the Silver Slugger Award with Abreu winning his 3rd and Tim Anderson and Eloy Jiménez winning their first. 

Abreu also won his first AL MVP Award becoming the 4th player in White Sox history to do so joining Nellie Fox (1959), Dick Allen (1972), and Frank Thomas (1993-94). Abreu in 2020 batted .317 with an OBP of .370 and lead the AL in Slugging percentage at .617 and hit 19 homers on the year. Abreu also Lead the MLB with 60 RBIs and 148 total bases. Abreu also won the Hank Aaron Award, the Sporting News Player of the Year Award, and the All-MLB Second Team for first base.

White Sox General Manager Rick Hahn won the Sporting News Executive of the Year Award for 2020 becoming the third White Sox Executive to win the award joining Roland Hemond (1972) and Bill Veeck (1977).

Farm system

References

External links
2020 Chicago White Sox at Baseball Reference
2020 Chicago White Sox season Official Site
2020 Chicago White Sox season at ESPN

Chicago White Sox seasons
Chicago White Sox
White Sox
2020 in Illinois
2020s in Chicago